Eustaquio is a given name. Notable people with the name include:

Eustaquio Escandón (1862–1933), Mexican polo player in the 1900 Summer Olympics
Eustaquio Ilundáin y Esteban (1862–1937), Cardinal of the Roman Catholic Church, Archbishop of Seville
José Eustaquio Alves Lemos Filho (born 1993), Brazilian professional footballer
Eustáquio van Lieshout, SS.CC., (1890–1943), Dutch missionary in Brazil
Palhinha (Vanderlei Eustaquio de Oliveira) (born 1950), retired Brazilian football player
Eustaquio Pedroso (1886 – death date unknown), Cuban baseball pitcher
Eustaquio Mira Ramos (born 1962), wheelchair basketball athlete from Spain
Eustaquio Díaz Vélez (1782–1856), Argentine military officer

See also
Mauro Eustáquio (born 1993), Canadian footballer, brother of Stephen
Stephen Eustáquio (born 1996), Canadian footballer, brother of Mauro
Eustaquio Méndez Province, province in the north-western parts of the Bolivian department Tarija
Eustace